Benjamin Shoemaker (3 August 1704 in Germantown, Philadelphia – 1767 in Philadelphia) was a colonial Pennsylvania Quaker, merchant, and politician. He served as mayor of Philadelphia in 1743, 1752, and 1760, and as city treasurer from 1751 to 1767. He also served on the Pennsylvania Provincial Council from 1745 to 1767.

His son Samuel Shoemaker served two terms as mayor.

His father, Isaac Schumacher (1669–1732), was born in Heidelberg, Germany and settled in the Province of Pennsylvania.

References

External links
Genealogical information

1704 births
1767 deaths
People of colonial Pennsylvania
Politicians from Philadelphia
Mayors of Philadelphia
Members of the Pennsylvania Provincial Council
American people of German descent
American Quakers
Colonial American merchants